The 2023 Commonwealth Youth Games, officially known as the VII Commonwealth Youth Games and informally as  Trinbago 2023, is a  youth sporting event to be held in Port of Spain, Trinidad and Tobago in 2023. They will be the seventh edition of the Commonwealth Youth Games. The games were initially scheduled  between 1 and 7 August 2021 but were postponed and now will be held from 4 to 11 August 2023 as a result of the global COVID-19 pandemic and scheduling issues with the 2020 Summer Olympics and the 2022 Commonwealth Games.

The 2023 Commonwealth Youth Games will be the first to be held since the death of Queen Elizabeth II and the accession of King Charles III as Head of the Commonwealth and the reigning monarch of the Commonwealth Realms on 8 September 2022.

Host selection

First selection

Accepted bid
 Belfast, Northern Ireland
With the backing of the Northern Ireland Assembly and the Commonwealth Games Council for Northern Ireland, Belfast submitted an official bid for the games. On 29 November 2015, it was confirmed that Northern Ireland was the only official, and thus the preferred, bid. They were named the official hosts in January 2016, with the Games originally scheduled for 27 July to 1 August 2021. Robert McVeigh, the Chair of the Northern Ireland Commonwealth Games Council, said he was "delighted" that the bid was successful.

In June 2018, Belfast was stripped of the Games due to uncertainty surrounding funding for the event during the absence of a functioning Northern Ireland Executive. This was as £3 million of grants had not been signed off by the Executive before it collapsed in January 2017, meaning the Games had a significant funding gap.

Withdrawn bids
 Gaborone, Botswana
The Botswana National Olympic Committee stated it was preparing a bid for the 2021 Commonwealth Youth Games.

 Saint Helier, Jersey
Jersey was considering a bid in early 2015 but pulled out of the bidding process in June 2015. The withdrawal came as Botswana and Northern Ireland placed bids - Paul du Feu, Jersey's Commonwealth Games Association leader commented that "when you're up against opposition with a bigger population and totally different infrastructure you have to be realistic".

Second selection
Following the stripping of the games from Belfast, a new selection process has been initiated, which lasted for six months. Port of Spain, Trinidad and Tobago was announced as new host on 21 June 2019.

Accepted bid

 Port of Spain, Trinidad and Tobago

Other bids

 Gibraltar City, Gibraltar

Third selection
Following the postponement, Trinidad and Tobago were elected host of the 2023 Commonwealth Youth Games in Birmingham, England at the Commonwealth Games Federation general assembly.

Accepted bid
 Port of Spain, Trinidad and Tobago

Organisation

Postponement
Since the spread of the COVID-19 pandemic, the Tokyo Olympic and Paralympic Games were moved to 2021 during the original dates of the Commonwealth Youth Games, the CGF considered the best alternative options and time frames for holding the event in the future, potentially in 2023, to avoid clashing with the Birmingham 2022 Commonwealth Games, with Trinidad and Tobago having the first option to hold the event. On 26 July 2022, it was announced that the 7th Commonwealth Youth Games will be held in 2023 in Port of Spain, Trinidad and Tobago.

Marketing

Mascot
On March 16, 2023, the Minister of Sport and Community Development, Shamfa Cudjoe, revealed the games' mascot, Cocoyea. Cocoyea is a Leatherback sea turtle. The mascot was designed by Djibril Annisette, who won a design competition that was run for children.

Participation
74 Commonwealth Games Associations are eligible to participate:

Sports 
The following competitions will take place

Venues
Hasely Crawford Stadium,  Mucurapo, Port of Spain - Athletics
Ato Boldon Stadium, Couva - Rugby sevens
National Cycling Velodrome, Couva - Cycling
National Aquatic Centre, Couva - Swimming

Ceremonies

Opening ceremony

The opening ceremony will take place on 4 August 2023.

Closing ceremony

The closing ceremony will take place on 11 August 2023 and the Commonwealth Games Federation flag will be handed over the representatives of the 2025 Commonwealth Youth Games.

References

External links 

2023 Commonwealth Youth Games - Commonwealth Games Federation
TTCGA on Twitter
TTNOC on Twitter

2021

Commonwealth Youth Games
Commonwealth Youth Games
Commonwealth Youth Games
Commonwealth Youth Games
Commonwealth Youth Games, 2021